Jiří Bis (26 April 1941 in Ivančice – 3 October 2018) was a Czech politician who served as a Senator from 2008 to 2014.

References

1941 births
2018 deaths
People from Ivančice
Communist Party of Czechoslovakia politicians
Czech Social Democratic Party Senators